Hilton, Easter Ross, may refer to:

 Hilton of Cadboll
 Hilton (near Portmahomack), Highland